This is a list of airlines currently operating in Eswatini.

See also
 List of airlines
 List of defunct airlines of Eswatini

References

 

Eswatini
Airlines
Airlines
Eswatini